Steven William Sciullo (born August 27, 1980) is a former American football guard of the National Football League (NFL). He played college football at Marshall

Early life
Sciullo was born on August 27, 1980, to Karen Ann Sciullo, a hair stylist, and Mario Sciullo a construction superintendent. He is of Italian and Polish descent. He attended Shaler Area High School, graduating in 1998.

College

He started 52 consecutive games at Marshall University. He is perhaps best known as one of the two Thundering Herd linemen who carried quarterback Byron Leftwich down the field against Akron, after Leftwich had fractured his tibia earlier in the game.

Sciullo was interested in coaching halfway through his final season of college football.

NFL career

He was originally drafted by the Indianapolis Colts in the fourth round of the 2003 NFL Draft, starting 13 games as a rookie. He was the fourth offensive lineman in Indianapolis Colts history to start a season opener as a rookie. However, Sciullo failed to make the cut at the training camp in 2004.

The Philadelphia Eagles took Sciullo in four days before the season opener, and he went on to start five times throughout the season on account of Jermane Mayberry's injuries. He even participated in Super Bowl XXXIX, losing to the New England Patriots. He retired as a member of the Carolina Panthers in 2007 after a season without any playtime.

Post-football career
Sciullo began working at Hampton Township School District in 2009, teaching at the middle school and high school buildings when needed. Sciullo works as a security director protecting students and teachers as well as administrators.

He became the head coach of the neighboring Deer Lakes High School varsity football team. “The style I teach is a hybrid of Marshall football, Tony Dungy and Indianapolis Colts football, and Andy Reid and Philadelphia Eagles football,” Sciullo says, regarding his coaching methods. In 2015 Sciullo was named as Pittsburgh Steelers' High School Football Coach of the Week.

On January 26, 2016, Sciullo presented the Shaler Area School District with a commemorative Golden Football through the NFL's Super Bowl High School Honor Roll program during halftime at the boys varsity basketball game.

Most recently, Sciullo resigned from head coaching at Deer Lakes Highschool to take a position on the coaching staff of the Hampton Talbots for the 2018-2019 season. Sciullo was recently inducted into Shaler Area High Schools Hall of Fame.

References

1980 births
Living people
Sportspeople from Pennsylvania
Players of American football from Pennsylvania
American football offensive guards
Marshall Thundering Herd football players
Indianapolis Colts players
Philadelphia Eagles players
Carolina Panthers players
Hamburg Sea Devils players
American expatriate sportspeople in Germany